Oak Point may refer to the following places:

Canada
Oak Point, Manitoba, an unincorporated community and settlement
Oak Point, a small community in Greenwich Parish, New Brunswick
Oak Point, a community in the local service district of Oak Point-Bartibog Bridge, New Brunswick

United States
Oak Point (Hollywood) or Arapahoe, a neighborhood in Florida
Oak Point, Texas, a suburban village
Oak Point, Washington, an unincorporated community

Other uses
Oak Point Link, a short railroad line in New York
Oak Point Park and Nature Preserve, a park in Plano, Texas

See also
 Pointe-du-Chêne, New Brunswick
 Pointe-au-Chêne, a neighbourhood of Grenville-sur-la-Rouge, Quebec